Monazite-(La) is a relatively rare representative of the monazite group, with lanthanum being the dominant rare earth element in its structure. As such, it is the lanthanum analogue of monazite-(Ce), monazite-(Nd), and monazite-(Sm). It is also the phosphorus analogue of gasparite-(La). The group contains simple rare earth phosphate minerals with the general formula of ATO4, where A = Ce, La, Nd, or Sm (or, rarely, Bi), and B = P or, rarely, As. The A site may also bear Ca and Th.

References

Lanthanum minerals
Phosphate minerals
Monoclinic minerals
Minerals in space group 14